Eumorpha fasciatus, the banded sphinx, is a moth of the family Sphingidae. The species was first described by Johann Heinrich Sulzer in 1776.

Distribution 
It is found from northern Argentina, Bolivia, Paraguay, Uruguay, Brazil, Colombia, Ecuador and Peru, north through Central America (Mexico, Belize, Guatemala, Honduras, Nicaragua, Costa Rica and Panama) to southern California and southern Arizona, east to Texas, Louisiana, Mississippi, Florida and South Carolina. Strays can be found north up to Missouri, Michigan, Indiana, Pennsylvania, New Jersey, New York and Nova Scotia. It is also found in the Caribbean.

Description

Biology 
Adults are on wing year round in the tropics, but in the north, there are at least two generations with adults on wing from the end of May to July and the end of August to October in South Carolina and from May to October in Louisiana. Adults have been recorded feeding on nectar of Crinum, Catharanthus roseus, Petunia and Saponaria officinalis.

The larvae feed on Ludwigia (including L. decurrens, L. erecta, L. leptocarpa, L. octovalvis, L. peruviana and L. repens), Cissus verticillata, Fuchsia hybrida, Magnolia virginiana, Parthenocissus and Vitis species. The larvae are highly variable in patterning and depth of color. Pupation takes place in burrows.

Subspecies
Eumorpha fasciatus fasciatus
Eumorpha fasciatus tupaci (Kernbach, 1962) (Galápagos Islands)

Gallery

References

External links

F
Moths of Central America
Moths of North America
Sphingidae of South America
Moths of the Caribbean
Moths of South America
Moths described in 1776
Taxa named by Johann Heinrich Sulzer